Conway is an unincorporated community in Carson County, Texas, United States. Conway is located along Interstate 40 in southern Carson County. The community began in 1892 when the Lone Star School was established in the area; the school was the first permanent school in the Texas Panhandle. The first post office opened in the community in 1903, and the town was platted in 1905; at this time, it was named after county commissioner H. B. Conway. By 1912, Conway had a church and various businesses, and the town formed a community club in the 1920s. In 1943, the town's school consolidated with the Panhandle school district, and the school building became a community center. The town's post office closed in 1976. As of 2016, Conway had a reported population of three.

References

External links

Unincorporated communities in Carson County, Texas
Unincorporated communities in Texas